Narragansett Regional High School (NRHS) is a US public high school serving students from the towns of Templeton, Massachusetts and Phillipston, Massachusetts, United States.  The principal is Colby young Vasil, previously principal of Millbury Jr./Sr. High, began her tenure with Narragansett on July 1, 2016. The vice principal is Colby Young. The Narragansett Regional School District superintendent is Christopher Casavant. The school is located in Baldwinville, a village that is part of Templeton.

In 2010, a multimillion-dollar project to erect a 1.5 megawatt wind turbine was completed behind the school's practice field.  The turbine was named after John LeClerc, a middle school technology teacher.  The LeClerc Wind Turbine serves as the finish area for the LeClerc Wind Turbine 5K.  The race is run annually on the first Saturday in August as a scholarship benefit for Narragansett Cross Country Runners.

Athletics
Cheering; 
Basketball (girls and boys);
Football;
Soccer (girls and boys);
Ice hockey (co-op with Gardner);
Swimming;
Softball; 
Baseball;
Field Hockey; 
Track (winter and spring);
Marching Band;
and Cross Country.

References

External links
 

Schools in Worcester County, Massachusetts
Public high schools in Massachusetts